dm-drogerie markt (usually abbreviated as dm) is a chain of retail stores headquartered in Karlsruhe, Germany, offering cosmetics, healthcare items, household products and health food and drinks. The company was founded in 1973, when it opened its first store in Karlsruhe.

In its industry sector, dm-drogerie markt is Germany's largest retailer measured by revenues. The company is known for its flat hierarchical structures and high level of social commitment. Götz Werner claimed that the well-being of employees is more important than the company's returns.

dm has more than 62,600 people employed in more than 3,700 stores in twelve European countries. In the 1970s, dm only had outlets in Germany and Austria. In the 1990s, it opened stores in the Czech Republic, Hungary, Slovenia, Slovakia, and Croatia. In the 2000s, the company expanded to Serbia, Bosnia-Herzegovina, Romania, Bulgaria, North Macedonia, Italy and Poland.

In March 2017, for the first time in its history, dm-drogerie markt started selling to consumers outside Europe with an Alibaba Group's Tmall Global cross-border flagship store to China. This expansion was initiated and is managed by a Shanghai-based Tmall Partner oddity Asia.

Locations 
Figures for the number of stores in Europe as of 6 December 2022:

See also
 Müller
 Rossmann

References

External links
 

Retail companies of Germany
Retail companies established in 1973
Companies based in Baden-Württemberg
Companies based in Karlsruhe
Cosmetics_companies_of_Germany
Cosmetics brands
German brands